Mabbuke is a village in the Punjab province of Pakistan. It is located at 31°7'0N 74°39'0E with an altitude of 191 metres (629 feet).

References

Villages in Punjab, Pakistan